Lost but Win is an upcoming Chinese action road drama film directed by Xin Zhao and starring Michael Tse, Jason Chu, Jerry Lamb, Yuen Wah and Yuen Qiu. Touted as China's first motorcycling racing film, the film began production on 20 September 2020.

Plot
Fifteen years ago, Tong (Jason Chu) left the motorcycling racing team and today, his teammate Wah (Michael Tse) has become a champion. Tong returns on the race circuit and challenges Wah to take the championship but loses since Wah has been honing his skills every single day for the past 15 years. Thus, Tong works hard to mentor and pass on his skills to a gifted racer, Hau-yung (Jerry Lamb).

Cast
Michael Tse as Wah (阿華)
Jason Chu as Tong (阿棠)
Jerry Lamb as Hau-yung (孝勇)
Yuen Wah
Yuen Qiu

Production
Producer Yang Rui revealed that the script for Lost But Win took three years to develop. Touted as China's first motorcycling racing film, production for Lost But Win was due to begin in March 2020, but was postponed as a result of the COVID-19 pandemic. Principal photography for the film officially began on 20 September 2020 and will be filmed throughout the Guangdong-Hong Kong-Macau Greater Bay Area.

On 3 October 2020, the film held a production commencement ceremony at the Zhuhai International Circuit where the cast and crew attended. At the event,  Michael Tse revealed that he sought advice from a real motorcycling racing champion and diligently lost weight in order to convincing portray the role of a professional motorcycling racer.

On 29 October 2020, the film held a press conference in Shenzhen where over 600 people attended, including the cast and crew, fans, motorcycle lovers and news reporters, where producer Yang introduced every crew member to the press, as well as explaining the production progress the clever integration of the filming locations of Shenzhen, Zhuhai and Macau.

See also
Yuen Wah filmography
List of biker films

References

Upcoming films
Chinese action drama films
Chinese sports drama films
Chinese auto racing films
Motorcycle racing films
Tencent Pictures films
Mandarin-language films
Films shot in Macau
Films shot in Guangdong